Qantara.de (Classical Arabic:  , meaning "bridge") is an Internet portal in German, English, and Arabic, produced by Deutsche Welle in order to promote intercultural dialogue between the Western and Islamic worlds.

The portal was founded on the initiative of the German Foreign Office, in reaction to the September 11 attacks in the U.S. Online since March 2003, the platform is funded by the foreign office and cooperates with the Goethe-Institut (GI) and the German Institute for Foreign Cultural Relations (ifa) as members of the project advisory committee.

Qantara.de wants to promote intercultural dialogue and understanding between the West and Islamic cultures, with the aim of combating ignorance and prejudice through reliable information.

The editorial team presents journalistic articles about politics, society, culture and photographic essays by Western and Muslim authors, who seek open and respectful discussion of both communities, including controversial subjects. These have included contributors such as the Egyptian literary scholar Nasr Hamid Abu Zaid, the German former diplomat and Muslim Murad Hofmann, the conflict researcher Heiner Bielefeldt and the physicist Ernst Ulrich von Weizsäcker.

References

Further reading

External links

Online-only journals